The third season of The Mentalist premiered on September 23, 2010 and concluded with its 2-hour season finale on May 19, 2011. The season consisted of 24 episodes.

Cast and characters

Main cast 
 Simon Baker as Patrick Jane (24 episodes)
 Robin Tunney as Teresa Lisbon (24 episodes)
 Tim Kang as Kimball Cho (24 episodes)
 Owain Yeoman as Wayne Rigsby (24 episodes)
 Amanda Righetti as Grace Van Pelt (24 episodes)

Recurring cast 
 Aunjanue Ellis as Madeleine Hightower (10 episodes)
 Pruitt Taylor Vince as J.J. LaRoche (8 episodes)
 Eric Winter as Craig O'Laughlin (7 episodes)
 Michael Gaston as Gale Bertram (6 episodes)
 Rebecca Wisocky as Brenda Shettrick (5 episodes)

Notable guest cast 
 Malcolm McDowell as Bret Stiles ("The Blood On His Hands")
 Leslie Hope as Kristina Frye ("The Blood On His Hands")
 Jack Coleman as Max Winter ("Red Carpet Treatment")
 Currie Graham as Walter Mashburn ("Red Hot")
 Željko Ivanek as Linus Wagner ("Ball of Fire")
 John Billingsley as Ellis Mars ("Red Moon")
 Connor Trinneer as Deputy Bob Woolgar ("Red Moon")
 Gregory Itzin as Virgil Minelli ("Jolly Red Elf")
 Linda Park as Dr Montague ("Bloodhounds")
 Ethan Phillips as Newsome Kirk ("The Red Mile")
 Morena Baccarin as Erica Flynn ("Every Rose Has Its Thorn")
 David Norona as Osvaldo Ardiles ("Rhapsody in Red")
 Bradley Whitford as Timothy Carter/Fake Red John ("Strawberries and Cream - Part 2")
 Bryan Lugo as Rusty Moores ("Red Moon")

Episodes

International reception 
In the UK, the third season premiered on Friday 15 October at 9 pm on Channel Five to 2.18 million viewers, nearly 1 million less than the second season's premiere.  Overall, the season averaged 2.08 million viewers (21% less than the previous season), making this the least watched season of the series so far.  The most watched episode was Jolly Red Elf (2.62 million), and the least watched episode was Pink Chanel Suit (1.74 million).  The season ended on Friday 10 June.

DVD release 
All 24 episodes were released on the five disc complete third season set. It was released on September 20, 2011 in Region 1, October 10, 2011 in Region 2, and October 26, 2011 in Region 4. It included the featurettes "The Mentalist: Portrait of a Serial Killer- Red John" and "'Red Moon' Directed by Simon Baker" as well as unaired scenes.

References

External links 
 
 
 

2010 American television seasons
2011 American television seasons
The Mentalist seasons